TBF can refer to:

Tert-butyl formate, an organic chemical compound with molecular formula C5H10O2
Grumman TBF Avenger, a World War II torpedo bomber
Tingle's Balloon Fight, a game for the Nintendo DS
The Beat Fleet, Croatian rap group
The Black Fish, an international marine conservation organisation
To be fair, internet slang
Token bucket filter
Total Batters Faced, a baseball statistic
Türkiye Bisiklet Federasyonu
Turkish Basketball Federation
Turkish Bridge Federation